"El Cantante" is the 1978 signature song of Puerto Rican salsa singer Héctor Lavoe and first single of the album Comedia. The song was written by Rubén Blades and produced by Willie Colón. The 2006 movie about Lavoe's life, El Cantante, takes its title from the song.

Ángel López version
In late 2004 Puerto Rican singer Ángel López released a cover of the song as a solo artist after being the lead singer of the group Son By Four. His version had airplay success in the U.S. Tropical Charts by Billboard.

Charts

References 

1978 songs
Héctor Lavoe songs
Marc Anthony songs
Víctor Manuelle songs
Ivy Queen songs
Songs written by Rubén Blades